The Lithuania women's national field hockey team represents Lithuania in women's international field hockey competitions.

Tournament history

European championships

EuroHockey Championship
 1999 – 8th place

EuroHockey Championship II
 2005 – 6th place
 2007 – 6th place
 2009 – 8th place
 2013 – 8th place
 2021 – 8th place

EuroHockey Championship III
 2011 – 
 2015 – 
 2017 – 
 2019 –

Hockey World League
 2012–13 – Round 1
 2014–15 – 31st place
 2016–17 – Round 1

FIH Hockey Series
2018–19 – First round

See also
Lithuania men's national field hockey team

References 

European women's national field hockey teams
Field hockey
National team